Semeling Bypass, Federal Route 253, is a major highway bypass in Semeling, Kuala Muda District, Kedah, Malaysia. The Kilometre Zero is located at Taman Tasek Indah junctions near Semeling.

History
In 2012, the highway was gazetted as Federal Route 253.

Features
At most sections, the Federal Route 253 was built under the JKR R5 road standard, allowing maximum speed limit of up to 90 km/h.

List of junctions

References

Highways in Malaysia
Malaysian Federal Roads